Charley Armey (born July 16, 1939) is a former American football coach, scout, and executive. He was an assistant and then interim head coach for the Denver Gold of the United States Football League (USFL) in 1983. He was a scout for the Green Bay Packers (1985–1987), Atlanta Falcons (1987–1991), and New England Patriots (1991–1997). He was the general manager of the St. Louis Rams 2000 to 2005 after being a scout for the Rams. His brother is Dick Armey.

Head coaching record

College

References

1939 births
Living people
Atlanta Falcons scouts
Buffalo Bills scouts
Green Bay Packers scouts
Colorado State Rams football coaches
Montana Grizzlies football coaches
Montana Tech Orediggers football coaches
National Football League general managers
New England Patriots scouts
North Dakota State Bison football coaches
St. Louis Rams executives
St. Louis Rams scouts
United States Football League coaches
Valley City State Vikings football players
High school football coaches in Minnesota